Oleg Anatolyevich Syomin (born 15 December 1974) is a former Russian professional footballer.

Club career
He made his professional debut in the Russian Second Division in 1993 for FC Bulat Cherepovets.

Honours
 Russian Cup finalist: 2001 (played in the early stages of the 2000–01 tournament for FC Anzhi Makhachkala).

References

1974 births
Living people
Russian footballers
Association football midfielders
Russian Premier League players
FC Lada-Tolyatti players
PFC Krylia Sovetov Samara players
FC Lokomotiv Nizhny Novgorod players
FC Anzhi Makhachkala players
FC Metallurg Lipetsk players
FC Orenburg players
FC Bulat Cherepovets players
FC Spartak Nizhny Novgorod players
FC Dynamo Kirov players